Llandyfriog is a community in Ceredigion, Wales. It includes the Adpar part of Newcastle Emlyn and the villages, Bangor Teifi, Trebedw, Bryndioddef-isaf, Glyncaled, Berthyfedwen, Pont Ceri and Llanfair Orllwyn. In 2011, the population of the community was 1835 with 54.7% able to speak Welsh.

Gerard H. L. Fitzwilliams M.D., Ch.B., F.R.C.S., (1882–1968), was a British physician who worked in Hong Kong and a spy in Russia at the end of WWI; he was born in the village.

See also
Llandyfriog transmitting station

References

Communities in Ceredigion